Tomaros (also Ολύτσικας - Olytsikas or Tomaros) is a mountain in southwestern Ioannina regional unit, Greece. Rising to the south of the archaeological site of Dodona, it is part of the Pindus mountain range. Its maximum elevation is 1,974 m. The nearest mountains are the Xerovouni to the southeast and the Souli Mountains to the southwest. There are forests in the lower areas, the highest areas consist of dry grasslands.

The nearest villages are Vargiades to the southeast, Lippa to the southwest
and Dodoni to the north. The Egnatia Odos motorway (Igoumenitsa - Ioannina -Kozani - Thessaloniki - Alexandroupoli) passes northwest of the mountain with tunnels.

Etymology

Two suggestions have been proposed.

Related to Greek temno cut + oros mountain (sharp mountain) PIE *tom-/*tem- "cut", Vale of Tempe, Tomi city, Tomouroi priests of Dodona (wood-cutters) or chastified (with cutten tail, line oura) or tomarion diminutive of tomos slice, piece of land, tome, volume.

Related to Tmor and Tomori mountains in Illyria and Illyrian eponym Temus. A proposed Illyrian word for "dark", PIE *temes  akin to Latin tenebrae "darkness", temere "blindly, by chance", Old Irish temel "darkness", Middle Irish teimen "dark grey", Old High German demar "darkness", dinstar "dark", Old Church Slavonic tǐma "darkness", tǐmǐnǔ "dark", etc

References

External links
 Tomaros on GTP Travel Pages

Landforms of Ioannina (regional unit)
Mountains of Greece
Mountains of Epirus (region)